Tanjung Batu is a village in Banawa district, Donggala Regency in Central Sulawesi province, Indonesia. Its population is 2554.

Climate
Tanjung Batu has a dry tropical rainforest climate (Af) with moderate rainfall year-round. It is one of the driest places in Indonesia.

References

 Populated places in Central Sulawesi